The Charles D. Elliott House is a historic house at 7 Colman Street in Newton, Massachusetts.  The -story wood-frame house was probably built in the 1860s, and is one of Newton's finest Second Empire houses.  It has a mansard roof pierced by dormers with rounded or triangular gabled pediments.  Its main facade has a slightly projecting central section, which includes an elaborately decorated porch that projects further forward and extends the full width of the front.  Charles D. Elliott was part owner of a local coal and lumber yard.

The house was listed on the National Register of Historic Places in 1986.

See also
 National Register of Historic Places listings in Newton, Massachusetts

References

Houses on the National Register of Historic Places in Newton, Massachusetts
Second Empire architecture in Massachusetts
Houses completed in 1865